Sir Thomas Walker Arnold  (19 April 1864 – 9 June 1930) was a British orientalist and historian of Islamic art. He taught at Muhammadan Anglo-Oriental College, later Aligarh Muslim University, and Government College University, Lahore.

Arnold was a friend of Sir Syed Ahmed Khan, who influenced him to write the famous book The Preaching of Islam, and of Shibli Nomani, with whom he taught at Aligarh. He taught Syed Sulaiman Nadvi and the poet-philosopher Muhammad Iqbal. He was the first English editor for the first edition of The Encyclopaedia of Islam.

Life
Thomas Walker Arnold was born in Devonport, Plymouth on 19 April 1864, and educated at the City of London School. From 1888 he worked as a teacher at the Muhammadan Anglo-Oriental College, Aligarh. In 1892 he married Celia Mary Hickson, a niece of Theodore Beck. 

In 1898, he accepted a post as Professor of Philosophy at the Government College, Lahore and later became Dean of the Oriental Faculty at Punjab University. 

From 1904 to 1909, he was on the staff of the India Office as Assistant Librarian. In 1909 he was appointed Educational Adviser to Indian students in Britain. From 1917 to 1920 he acted as Adviser to the Secretary of State for India. He was Professor of Arabic and Islamic Studies at the School of Oriental Studies, University of London, from 1921 to 1930.

Arnold was invested as a Companion of the Order of the Indian Empire in 1912, and in 1921 was invested as a knight. He died on 9 June 1930.

Works
 
 (trans. and ed.) The little flowers of Saint Francis by Francis of Assisi. London: J.M. Dent, 1898.
 The Court Painters of the Grand Moghuls. Oxford: Oxford University Press, 1921.
 The Caliphate. Oxford: Clarendon Press, 1924. Reissued with an additional chapter by Sylvia G. Haim: Routledge and Kegan Paul, London 1965.
 Painting in Islam, A Study of the Place of Pictorial Art in Muslim Culture. Oxford: Clarendon Press, 1928. Reprint ed. 1965.
 Bihzad and his Paintings in the Zafar-namah ms. London: B. Quaritch, 1930.
 (with Alfred Guillaume) The Legacy of Islam. Oxford: Oxford University Press, 1931.
 The Old and New Testaments in Muslim Religious Art. London: Pub. for the British Academy by H. Milford, Oxford University Press. Schweich Lectures for 1928.

References

External links
Arnold, Sir Thomas Walker , School of Oriental and African Studies: home page
Sir Thomas Walker entry in Encyclopaedia Iranica

1864 births
1930 deaths
Alumni of Magdalene College, Cambridge
Academic staff of Aligarh Muslim University
English orientalists
British historians of Islam
People educated at the City of London School
Academic staff of the Government College University, Lahore
Victorian writers
19th-century English writers
20th-century English writers
20th-century English male writers
Knights Bachelor
Companions of the Order of the Indian Empire